Tennessee, the Volunteer State, has many symbols.

Official symbols of the state are designated by act of the Tennessee General Assembly. The earliest state symbol was the first state seal, which was authorized by the original state constitution of 1796 and first used in 1802. The current seal design was adopted in 1987. The most recent designation of an official state symbol was in 2011, when "Tennessee", written by John R. Bean of Knoxville, was designated the ninth state song.

The General Assembly also has officially designated a state slogan, "Tennessee—America at Its Best," adopted in 1965, and a state motto, "Agriculture and Commerce," adopted in 1987 and based on the words on the state seal.

Tennessee's best-known unofficial symbol probably is its nickname, "The Volunteer State", which originated during the War of 1812 when many Tennesseans enlisted in the military in response to Governor Willie Blount's call for volunteers.


State symbols

State songs
In 2003, a resolution of the 103rd General Assembly designated songwriting as an official state art form. In keeping with this designation, Tennessee has nine official state songs:
"My Homeland, Tennessee", by Nell Grayson Taylor (words) and Roy Lamont Smith (music), was adopted as a state song by the General Assembly in 1925.
"When It's Iris Time in Tennessee", by Willa Waid Newman, was designated a state song in 1935, two years after the iris became the state flower.
"My Tennessee", by Frances Hannah Tranum, is the state's official public school song, adopted by the General Assembly in 1955.
"Tennessee Waltz", by Redd Stewart and Pee Wee King, was designated an official song of the state by the General Assembly in 1965.
"Rocky Top", by Felice and Boudleaux Bryant, was adopted as an official song of Tennessee in 1982.
"Tennessee", by Vivian Rorie, was designated an official song in 1992.
"The Pride of Tennessee", by Fred Congdon, Thomas Vaughn and Carol Elliot, was designated an official song in 1996.
"Smoky Mountain Rain", a song written by Kye Fleming and Dennis Morgan that became a hit for Ronnie Milsap, was added to the list of state songs by the General Assembly on June 3, 2010, giving the state its eighth state song. In the 2010 legislative session, the General Assembly also considered a resolution to designate "So I'll Just Shine in Tennessee" as a state song, but took no action on that proposal.
"Tennessee", written by John R. Bean of Knoxville, was designated an official state song in 2011.

Additionally, a rap song by Joan Hill Hanks of Signal Mountain, entitled "A Tennessee Bicentennial Rap: 1796-1996", was designated the state's "Official Bicentennial Rap" song in 1996. It was written "to provide a fun and easy way for citizens and students to learn and retain some of  state's history."

State poem
A poem entitled "Oh Tennessee, My Tennessee" was designated the official state poem by the 88th General Assembly in 1973. The poem was written by U.S. Navy Admiral William P. Lawrence while in solitary confinement in a prisoner of war camp in North Vietnam.

State folk dance
In 1980 the General Assembly designated the square dance as the state's official state folk dance, which it described as "a uniquely attractive art form that remains a vibrant and entertaining part of Tennessee folklore."

See also
Lists of United States state symbols
Tennessine - an element named for the state

References

External links
Tennessee State Symbols at Tennessee.gov

State symbols
Tennessee
Symbols of Tennessee